A fortochka is a small ventilation window. It usually spans the frame of one window pane and opens on hinges independently of the whole window.

A fortochka can be used for ventilation during cold winters, when opening a whole window would be impractical for heat conservation purposes.

See also
 Sash window
 Transom (architecture)
 Wicket gate

References

Architectural elements
Windows